Comet C/1861 G1 (Thatcher) is a long-period comet with roughly a 415-year orbit that is expected to return around 2283. It was discovered by A. E. Thatcher. It is responsible for the April Lyrid meteor shower. Carl Wilhelm Baeker also independently found this comet.

C/1861 G1 is listed as a long-period "non-periodic comet" because it has not yet been observed at two perihelion passages. When it is seen to come back around 2283, it should receive the P/ designation.

The comet is the parent body of the April Lyrids meteor shower.

See also 
 C/1861 J1 – Great comet of 1861
 153P/Ikeya–Zhang – periodic comet with a 366-year orbit

References

External links 
 

Long-period comets
Meteor shower progenitors
1860s in science
1861 in science